Podjenin  is a village in the administrative district of Gmina Bogdaniec, within Gorzów County, Lubusz Voivodeship, in western Poland. The village has a population of 110.

References

Podjenin